Melanoplus puer, known generally as least short-wing grasshopper, is a species of spur-throated grasshopper in the family Acrididae. Other common names include the Florida spur-throat grasshopper and least short-winged locust. It is found in North America.

References

Melanoplinae
Articles created by Qbugbot
Insects described in 1878